Hope Airport  is a state-owned public-use airport located one nautical mile (2 km) southeast of the central business district of Hope, in the Kenai Peninsula Borough of the U.S. state of Alaska. This airport is included in the FAA's National Plan of Integrated Airport Systems for 2011–2015, which categorized it as a general aviation facility.

Facilities and aircraft 
Hope Airport covers an area of 62 acres (25 ha) at an elevation of 200 feet (61 m) above mean sea level. It has one runway designated 16/34 with a gravel surface measuring 2,000 by 90 feet (610 x 27 m). For the 12-month period ending May 31, 2011, the airport had 480 aircraft operations, an average of 40 per month: 90% general aviation and 10% air taxi.

References

External links 
 
 Aerial image as of 3 September 1996 from USGS The National Map

Airports in Kenai Peninsula Borough, Alaska